The Central District of Khusf County is in South Khorasan province, Iran. At the National Census in 2006, its population (as a part of the former Khusf District of Birjand County) was 12,605 in 3,632 households. The following census in 2011 counted 18,091 people in 4,117 households. At the latest census in 2016, the district had 18,248 inhabitants in 4,325 households, by which time the district had been separated from the county and Khusf County established with two new districts..

References 

Khusf County

Districts of South Khorasan Province

Populated places in South Khorasan Province

Populated places in Khusf County